The Night of Love is a 1927 drama film, produced by Samuel Goldwyn, released by United Artists, and stars Ronald Colman, Vilma Bánky, and Montagu Love. The screenplay by Lenore J. Coffee is based on the play by Pedro Calderón de la Barca.

It tells the story of a gypsy chieftain, who in revenge for the Duke kidnapping his wife, gets revenge by stealing the duke's wife.

Cast
 Ronald Colman as Montero
 Vilma Bánky as Princess Marie
 Montagu Love as Duke de la Garda
 Natalie Kingston as Donna Beatriz
 John George as Jester
 Bynunsky Hyman as Bandit
 Gibson Gowland as Bandit
 Laska Winter as Gypsy Bride 
 Sally Rand as Gypsy Dancer 
 William H. Tooker as Spanish Ambassador 
 Eugenie Besserer as Gypsy

Censorship
The film was banned in 1927 by Eric W. Hamilton, a Hong Kong censor, who stated: "The subject matter is absolutely immoral and the depiction in many cases is indecent."

References

External links

The Night of Love at SilentEra

1927 films
American black-and-white films
American silent feature films
1927 drama films
American films based on plays
Films based on works by Pedro Calderón de la Barca
Samuel Goldwyn Productions films
Silent American drama films
United Artists films
1920s English-language films
1920s American films